Pryazovskyi State Technical University is a Ukrainian University in Mariupol. It is one of the oldest universities in the Donetsk Oblast.

History
PSTU was founded in November 1930 as a professional training school for the workers of ILYICH Iron & Steel Works. In 1933 it became Mariupol Metallurgical Institute. From 1948 until 1989 it was Zhdanov Metallurgical Institute. From 1989 – 1993 it again became Mariupol Metallurgical Institute. The Postgraduate Department was established in 1960. In 1993 PSTU received university status via Resolution no. 956 and became Pryazovskyi State Technical University. Since 2009 its official name is State Higher Education Institution “Pryazovskyi State Technical University”. Some of the university's buildings were destroyed during the Siege of Mariupol in 2022.

Campuses and buildings
Block 1 houses University administration offices. It was built in 1910, designed by architect Victor Nilsen as an eparchial school. University blocks 1, 2, 3, 5 and 9, are arranged into a closed square campus. In total, the University includes 12 buildings located in the historical part of the City on Grecheskaia and Universytetska streets. Hostels and canteen are in Apatova Street.

Institutes and faculties
The University incorporates an In-Service Training and Continuous Education Institute, Mechanic and Transport Research Institute, Metallurgy and Welding Research Institute, Economy and Management Research Institute. PSTU has faculties in Humanities, Engineering and Pedagogy, Information Technologies, Engineering and Language Training for International Students, Metallurgy, Mechanical Engineering, Welding, Transport Technologies, Economics and Power Engineering.

Notable alumni
Petro Shelest – member of Politburo of the CPSU Central Committee, First Secretary of Central Committee of Communist Party of Ukraine, Hero of Socialistic Labour, Deputy of Supreme Council of the Union of Soviet Socialist Republics (USSR) and the Ukrainian Soviet Socialist Republic (SSR)
Aleksei Titarenko – Second Secretary of Donetsk and Zaporozh’e Regional Communist Party Committee, Deputy of the Supreme Council of the USSR and the Ukrainian SSR
Viktor Kurchenko – Chairman of the Planning, Finance and Budget Committee of Supreme Council of the USSR, Deputy of Supreme Council of the Ukrainian SSR
Ihor Nahayevskyi, General Manager of “Zhdanovtiazhmash” Industrial Group, Deputy of Supreme Council of the Ukrainian SSR
Volodymyr Boiko – Chairman of the Board of Directors, General Manager of Joint Stock Company Ilyich Iron & Steel Works, Hero of Ukraine, People's Deputy of Verkhovna Rada of V and VI Call
Serhiy Taruta – Chairman of the Board of Directors of OAO “Industrialnyi Soiuz Donbassa”
Ihor Yushko – President of Ukrainian National Mortgage Association, Minister of Finance of Ukraine (2001), Deputy of Verkhovna Rada of Ukraine.
Amadeu Campos – Angola Director do gabinete Provincial de Luanda de Transportes Trafego e Mobilidade Urbana.

References

External links
Official site

Pryazovskyi State Technical University